Lazdona parish is an administrative unit of Madona Municipality, Latvia.

Towns, villages and settlements of Lazdona parish 

Parishes of Latvia
Madona Municipality